New Westminster—Burnaby is a federal electoral district in British Columbia, Canada, that was represented in the House of Commons of Canada from 1988 to 1997 and since 2015.

History 
The 1988–1997 edition of this riding was created in 1987 from parts of Burnaby and New Westminster—Coquitlam ridings. The riding consisted of the City of New Westminster and the southern part of the District Municipality of Burnaby. It was abolished in 1996 when it was merged into New Westminster—Coquitlam—Burnaby.

The riding was recreated following the 2012 federal electoral boundaries redistribution and was legally defined in the 2013 representation order. It was created from parts of Burnaby—New Westminster and New Westminster—Coquitlam. Its boundaries were legally defined in the 2013 representation order, which came into effect upon the call of the 42nd Canadian federal election, scheduled for October 2015.

Demographics

Members of Parliament

Election results

New Westminster—Burnaby, 2015–present

New Westminster—Burnaby, 1988–1997

See also 

 List of Canadian federal electoral districts
 Past Canadian electoral districts

Notes

References

External links 
Riding history from the Library of Parliament
 Website of the Parliament of Canada

British Columbia federal electoral districts
Federal electoral districts in Greater Vancouver and the Fraser Valley
Politics of Burnaby
New Westminster